Hardburly is an unincorporated community and coal town in Perry County, Kentucky, United States.

A post office was established in the community in 1918. The coal town was built around and named for the Hardy Burlington Mining Company. Their post office  closed in 2011.

References

Unincorporated communities in Perry County, Kentucky
Unincorporated communities in Kentucky
Coal towns in Kentucky